Roma Street busway station is located in Brisbane, Queensland, Australia serving the Brisbane central business district. It is located adjacent to Roma Street railway station and the Brisbane Transit Centre. It opened on 19 May 2008 when the Northern Busway was extended from Normanby to King George Square.

It is served by eight routes all operated by Brisbane Transport.

References

External links
[ Roma Street busway station] TransLink

Bus stations in Brisbane
Transport infrastructure completed in 2008
Roma Street, Brisbane